The Lake Victoria Fisheries Organization (LVFO) is an institution under the East African Community, with the aim to harmonise, develop and adopt conservation and management measures for the sustainable utilisation of living resources of Lake Victoria, and to optimise socio-economic benefits from the basin for the three partner states; Kenya, Tanzania and Uganda. The LVFO headquarters are in Jinja, Uganda. LVFO collaborates closely with the national fisheries research institutes in the three partner states.

LVFO was established in June 1994, on the basis of the CIFA Sub-Committee for the Development and Management of the Fisheries of Lake Victoria. CIFA is the FAO Committee for Inland Fisheries of Africa.

External links
Lake Victoria Fisheries Organization
Kenya Marine and Fisheries Research Institute
Tanzania Fisheries Research Institute
Uganda National Fisheries Resources Research Institute

Fisheries agencies
Lake Victoria
East African Community
Environmental organisations based in Uganda
1994 establishments in Uganda
Fisheries conservation organizations